Military rank system and military insignia of Bosnia and Herzegovina shows the military rank system and insignias used by the Army of the Republic of Bosnia and Herzegovina that existed from 1992 to 2005 and the current Armed Forces of Bosnia-Herzegovina (OSBIH - Oružane Snage Bosne i Hercegovine) that exists from 2006 to present. The ranks are defined in Article 155, Article 156, Article 157 and Article 158 of the Law on Service in the AFBiH.

Current ranks

Commissioned officer ranks
The rank insignia of commissioned officers.

Other ranks
The rank insignia of non-commissioned officers and enlisted personnel.

Historical ranks

Ranks (1992−1996)

Commissioned officer ranks 
The rank insignia of commissioned officers.

Other ranks 
The rank insignia of non-commissioned officers and enlisted personnel.

Ranks (1997−2005)

Commissioned officer ranks 
The rank insignia of commissioned officers.

Other ranks 
The rank insignia of non-commissioned officers and enlisted personnel.

References

External links
 

Ranks and insignia
 
Bosnia and Herzegovina